Craig Martin (born 4 August 1993) is a South African professional soccer player who plays as a right-back or right midfielder for PSL side Orlando Pirates. He previously played for Cape Town City FC, before being transferred to the Bucs in 2023.

Club career
Born in Cape Town, Martin grew up in the Kensington suburb of Cape Town. He attended Kensington High School and played for Kensington FC. He later spent two seasons with Hellenic and one with Glendene United before signing for Cape Town City in summer 2017. He made his debut for the club on 22 September 2017 as a 68th-minute substitute for Ayanda Patosi in a 1–0 win over Polokwane City. He made his first start the following week in a 2–0 win away to Ajax Cape Town. He scored the first goal of his professional career on 21 November 2017 in a 1–1 draw with Baroka. On 20 January 2018, he scored the only goal of the game as Cape Town City beat rivals Ajax Cape Town for the second time that season. He scored 3 goals in 22 league appearances in his first season at the club.

In January 2021, it was confirmed that Martin had contracted COVID-19. Later that month, he signed a three-year contract extension with the club, ending speculation of a possible transfer to Orlando Pirates.

International career
Martin was called up to the South Africa national soccer team for the first time in March 2021 for 2021 Africa Cup of Nations qualification matches against Ghana and Sudan.

He made his debut on 10 June 2021 in a friendly against Uganda.

Style of play
Martin can play as a right-back or as a right midfielder.

References

Living people
1993 births
South African soccer players
South Africa international soccer players
Soccer players from Cape Town
Association football fullbacks
Association football wingers
Hellenic F.C. players
Cape Town City F.C. (2016) players
SAFA Second Division players
South African Premier Division players